Biondo is an Italian surname. Notable people with the surname include:

Cayetano Biondo (1902–1986), Argentine actor
Flavio Biondo (1392–1463), Italian historian
Francesco Biondo (1735–1805), Italian painter
George Biondo (born 1954), American bass guitarist
Giovanni del Biondo (14th century), Italian painter
Joseph Biondo (1897–1973), member of the Gambino crime family
Maurizio Biondo (born 1981), Italian cyclist
Ron Biondo (born 1981), short track speed skater
Santa Biondo (1892–1989), American opera singer

Italian-language surnames